Frank Lee Houx (December 12, 1854 – April 3, 1941) was an American politician from the Democratic Party who served as the 10th Governor of Wyoming from 1917 to 1919 and the 5th Secretary of State of Wyoming from 1911 to 1919.

Life

Frank Lee Houx was born near Lexington, Missouri to George Washington Houx, who later served in the Confederate States Army under Sterling Price, and Frances Pearl Price on December 12, 1854, although he has conflicting dates of birth that go up to 1860. He grew up on his family's ranch and in 1875 he married Augusta Camp whom he later had three children with. On April 10, 1898, Augusta died and Houx remarried in 1899 to Ida Mason Christy whom he had four children with.

He took up the study of law, reading in the office of John S. Blackwell, of Lexington, Missouri. Houx did not complete his course, however, turning his attention to commercial interests. He graduated from Shaw's Business College in Kansas City, Missouri in 1884. The next year, he moved to Montana and went into the cattle business. In 1895, he took up residence in Cody, Wyoming, where he went into politics.

Politics

He became involved with William F. Cody and helped in the creation of Cody, Wyoming. In 1901 he ran for mayor of Cody following its incorporation in its first mayoral election and defeated George T. Beck. During his first term as Mayor, he also served as police judge from 1902 to 1903. He was re-elected to a second mayoral term in 1905. During the next four years, the town built a residence for him and it now serves as a bed and breakfast known as the "Mayor's Inn". From 1902 to 1903 he served as Cody's police judge and returned to the mayoralty from 1905 to 1909.

During the 1910 elections Houx was nominated by the Democratic Party for Secretary of State and won in the general election becoming the first Democrat to hold the office in Wyoming's history and was reelected in 1914 with both of his victories being extremely narrow. When Governor John B. Kendrick resigned his office on February 26, 1917, after being elected to the United States Senate, Houx became Acting Governor, and he served until the expiration of Kendrick's term, leaving office on January 6, 1919. He sought election as governor in his own right in 1918, but was defeated by Republican candidate Robert D. Carey.

During his service as governor during World War I, Houx mobilized the National Guard of Wyoming for federal service, appointed the Wyoming Council for National Defense, and nominated persons to administer the Selective Service draft. He supported alcoholic prohibition and during the process of ratification for the 18th Amendment he wrote to thirty seven governors asking for them to support the amendment and received support from sixteen of them. On January 19, 1918, his son, Christy Houx, was found dead after multiple draggings of Lindenmeier Lake after his iceboat had capsized on January 16.

Later life

Houx then went into the oil refining business in Texas. In 1931 he became involved in gold mining and established offices in Denver, Colorado to promote gold mining development in San Juan county. He returned to Cody in 1935 and in 1938 suffered a fall that caused him to break a hip, but later recovered. On April 3, 1941, he died at the Irma Hotel after suffering from an illness for two years at the age of 86 and was interred in Cody Cemetery. The autobiography he wrote in 1939 was published in serial form by the Cody Enterprise newspaper in the months following his death.

Electoral history

References

External links

The Mayor's Inn Bed & Breakfast

1854 births
1941 deaths
19th-century American politicians
20th-century American politicians
Democratic Party governors of Wyoming
Mayors of places in Wyoming
Secretaries of State of Wyoming
People from Cody, Wyoming
People from Denver
People from Lexington, Missouri
Writers from Missouri
Writers from Wyoming